Pret may refer to:
Preta, a ghost of the Hindu and Buddhist tradition
Pret a Manger, a British sandwich retail chain
Prêt-à-porter, ready-to-wear fashion; often abbreviated as Pret, as in Pret-line